Admiral The Honourable Sir Algernon Douglas Edward Harry Boyle  (21 October 1871 – 13 October 1949) was a Royal Navy officer who went on to be Fourth Sea Lord.

Naval career
Born the son of Henry Boyle, 5th Earl of Shannon, Boyle joined the Royal Navy as a cadet in 1884. He was promoted to Commander on 1 January 1902, and in April that year was assigned for temporary duty at the Admiralty. Four months later, he was in August 1902 posted to the protected cruiser HMS Isis.

He served in World War I and, as Captain of HMS Malaya, took part in the Battle of Jutland in 1916. He was Aide-de-camp to the King from 1918 to 1919 and served as Fourth Sea Lord from 1920 to 1924. He retired in 1924.

References

1871 births
1949 deaths
Royal Navy admirals
Knights Commander of the Order of the Bath
Companions of the Order of St Michael and St George
Members of the Royal Victorian Order
Lords of the Admiralty
Younger sons of earls
Algernon